Jamison High School is a public co-educational secondary day school, located in South Penrith in Western Sydney, New South Wales, Australia. The school is sited on the corner of Evan and Maxwell Streets, and stands adjacent to the Southlands Shopping Centre.

 the school has 1,124 students enrolled, ranging from Year 7 to Year 12. The school's motto is, "Carthago Delenda Est".

See also 

 List of government schools in Sydney
 Education in Australia 
 Penrith Selective High School

References

Educational institutions with year of establishment missing
Public high schools in Sydney
Penrith, New South Wales